Dante Emiliozzi (born January 16, 1916 in Olavarría, died January 24, 1989) was an Argentine racing driver. He won the Turismo Carretera championship four times.

References

1916 births
1989 deaths
Sportspeople from Buenos Aires Province
Argentine racing drivers
Turismo Carretera drivers
Argentine people of Italian descent